Matt Crowther (born 6 May 1974) is a former professional rugby league footballer who played in the 1990s and 2000s for the Sheffield Eagles, Huddersfield-Sheffield Giants and Hull FC in the Super League. He is the Head Physio at the Castleford Tigers in the Betfred Super League.

Club career
Crowther started his professional career with the Sheffield Eagles. Matt Crowther played  and scored a try in Sheffield Eagles' 17–8 victory over Wigan in the 1998 Challenge Cup Final during Super League III at Wembley Stadium, London on Saturday 2 May 1998. Following the club's merger with Huddersfield, he played for the Huddersfield-Sheffield Giants during Super League V before moving to Hull F.C. in September 2000. He remained at Hull until he was forced to retire in 2003 after breaking his leg in a match against the Castleford Tigers.

International career
Crowther was a Scotland international and played at the 2000 Rugby League World Cup.

References

External links
The Teams: Scotland

1974 births
Living people
English rugby league players
Huddersfield Giants players
Hull F.C. players
Rugby league wingers
Scotland national rugby league team players
Sheffield Eagles (1984) players
Rugby league players from Castleford